= Dundur =

Bennur
- Village
- Location in Karnataka, India Bennur (India)
- Coordinates: 15°26′24″N 75°18′49″E
- Country: India
- State: Karnataka
- District: Dharwad

Government
  - Body: Gram panchayat

Population (2011)
  - Total: 490

Languages
  - Official: Kannada
- Time zone: UTC+5:30 (IST)
- ISO 3166 code: IN-KA
- Vehicle registration: KA
- Website: karnataka.gov.in

Bennur is a village in Dharwad district of Karnataka, India.

== Demographics ==
As of the 2011 Census of India there were 120 households in Dundur and a total population of 490 consisting of 232 males and 258 females. There were 53 children ages 0-6.
